Boxing at the 2011 Canada Winter Games was held at the Halifax Forum in Halifax, Nova Scotia.

The events will be held during the second week between February 21 and 21, 2011. Boxing events were scheduled for just men.

In weight categories with less than 8 competitors, only one bronze medal was awarded. For the 91 kg category no bronze medal was awarded as only 5 athletes took part.

Medal table
The following is the medal table for alpine skiing at the 2011 Canada Winter Games.

Medalists

References

2011 in boxing
2011 Canada Winter Games